Here's to Us is a studio album by American Christian and country singer Cristy Lane. It was released in December 1982 via Liberty and LS Records and contained a total of ten tracks. It was the ninth studio album of Lane's career and spawned one single to country music radio titled "The Good Old Days". The single charted on the American country survey in 1982. The album itself also reached a charting position on the American country albums list.

Background and content
During the late 1970s and early 1980s, Cristy Lane had commercial success in country music with songs like "Let Me Down Easy" and "I Just Can't Stay Married to You". In 1980 she reached the number one spot with the Christian-themed "One Day at a Time", which brought her more public exposure. However, following the single's success, her commercial popularity began to wane, but she continued recording secular country material before transitioning to Christian music in the middle 1980s. Among these albums was 1982's Here's to Us. 

The project contained a total of ten tracks. The album featured a mixture of original recordings and covers of previously-recorded songs. Among its new tracks was "The Good Old Days" and the title track. Covers included Skeeter Davis' "The End of the World" and the Bee Gees' "Lost in Your Love". Here's to Us was recorded in April 1982 in sessions held in Nashville, Tennessee. The album was produced by Ron Oates.

Release and chart performance
Here's to Us was released in December 1982 on Liberty Records and LS Records. It was ninth studio album of Lane's career. It was issued as a vinyl LP with five tracks on either side of the record. It was her fifth LP to reach the Billboard Top Country Albums chart, peaking at number 42. It was also among her final albums to reach the country albums chart. The project included one single release, which was Lane's original track "The Good Old Days". The song was released as a single in September 1982 on Liberty Records. The song later charted on the Billboard Hot Country Songs chart, peaking at number 81. It was Lane's lowest-charting single on the country survey and among her final singles to reach a peak position.

Track listing

Personnel
All credits are adapted from the liner notes of Here's to Us.

Musical personnel

 Ken Bell – Acoustic guitar, electric rhythm guitar
 Larry Byrom – Electric guitar, electric lead guitar
 Buzz Cason – Background vocals
 Clay Caire – Drums
 Mark Casstevens – Acoustic guitar
 Doug Clement – Background vocals
 Mary Fielder – Background vocals
 Jon Goin – Acoustic guitar, electric guitar
 Lynda K. Lance – Background vocals
 The Linda K. Singers – Background vocals
 Anne Marie – Background vocals
 Terry McMillan – Harmonica
 Farell Morris – Percussion

 Nashville String Machine – Strings
 Louis Nunnley – Background vocals
 Ron Oates – Keyboards, percussion, prepared piano, synthesizer
 Joe Osborn – Bass
 Steve Schaeffer – Bass
 Donna Sheridan – Background vocals
 Reggie Young – Acoustic guitar, electric guitar
 Bergen White – Background vocals

Technical personnel
 David Brandt – Photography
 Jonathan Losie – Album design
 Henry Marquez – Art direction
 Ron Oates – Producer

Charts

Release history

References

1982 albums
Cristy Lane albums
Liberty Records albums
LS Records albums